John de Rednesse (died after 1386) was an English-born judge who served four times as Lord Chief Justice of Ireland.

He was the son of Stephen de Rednesse, whose family took their name from the village of Reedness in the then West Riding of Yorkshire. He is first heard of in 1327 when he received a royal pardon for killing one of his servants. He is unlikely to have been more than twenty at the time, since he was still alive almost sixty years later. Between 1335 and 1342 he served as Commissioner for the Peace in Yorkshire.

He came to Ireland in 1344 as a justice of the Court of King's Bench. In 1346 he was appointed Lord Chief Justice; he was later demoted to second justice of the King's Bench, and was then reappointed Chief Justice. In all, he served four terms as Lord Chief Justice. Such rapid changes of personnel on the medieval Irish bench were not uncommon, but they normally resulted from a clash between rivals for office; in Rednesse's case, unusually, he was replaced on each occasion by a different man. In his later years, a rival emerged in the person of Richard de Wirkeley, Prior of the Order of Hospitallers, who was appointed Lord Chief Justice in May 1356 after Rednesse apparently gave offence to the King by going to England without licence. However Wirkeley was quickly replaced by Rednesse, and was ordered by King Edward III not to intermeddle with the office. In 1359 we have a rare glimpse of his judicial work, when he was one of three judges empanelled to hear a case of novel disseisin between Thomas Norragh and John l'Enfaunt. In 1358 he sat on a commission of oyer and terminer with John Frowyk, the  Lord Chancellor of Ireland, Sir Thomas de Rokeby the younger and others, to inquire into the actions of those of the King's subjects who had sold arms and victuals to the King's enemies, or treacherously adhered to those enemies.

Like many officials of the time, Rednesse complained about non-payment of his salary, and in 1358 he felt strongly enough about the matter to issue a writ of certiorari. At the King's request, the Exchequer of Ireland inquired into the matter, and confirmed that Rednesse was indeed owed £94 in arrears, which was duly paid. In March 1361, by way of further compensation for the non-payment of his salary, he was given the manor of Termonfeckin, County Louth. 

Rednesse was finally removed from office later the same year. He returned to England, where he spent his later years in his native Yorkshire. He served as a Commissioner for the Peace in 1374. In 1386, by which time he must have been far advanced in years, he was one of several local landowners who were asked to conduct an inquiry into the illegal digging of a watercourse in the Holderness region of the East Riding of Yorkshire, which was causing a nuisance.

References

People from Goole
Lords chief justice of Ireland
14th-century births
14th-century deaths